Joseph E. Brown (April 4, 1859 – June 28, 1888 in Warren, Pennsylvania) was a pitcher/utility player in Major League Baseball for the Chicago White Stockings and Baltimore Orioles.

It was relatively common in the 19th century for baseball teams to use a reserve fielder as a pitcher, and this appears to be true in Brown's case. He appeared in 15 games for the 1884 Cubs (debuting August 16), pitching in seven of those games, six as a starter. His mark that season was 4–2 with a 4.68 ERA. He also played center field, right field, first baseman, and catcher for the Cubs that season, hitting .213 with 3 RBI in 61 trips to the plate.

Brown found himself with the American Association's Orioles in the 1886 season in a similar role for a brief period of time. He pitched in four games, completing and losing each one for a record of 0–4 and an ERA of 5.68. He also appeared in one game as a second baseman. Brown was 3-for-19 at the plate in 1886 to finish his career with a batting average of exactly .200 (16-for-80).

Brown died on June 28, 1888, in Warren, Pennsylvania, aged just 29.

External links

1859 births
1888 deaths
Baseball players from Pennsylvania
Chicago White Stockings players
Baltimore Orioles (AA) players
Major League Baseball outfielders
Major League Baseball pitchers
Major League Baseball first basemen
Major League Baseball second basemen
Major League Baseball catchers
Fort Wayne Hoosiers players
Milwaukee Brewers (minor league) players
Bridgeport Giants players
Jersey City Skeeters players
19th-century baseball players
People from Warren, Pennsylvania